"Take It Off" is a song recorded by American country music artist Joe Nichols. It was released in May 2011 as the only single from his seventh studio album, It's All Good. The song was written by Dallas Davidson, Ashley Gorley and Kelley Lovelace.

"Take It Off" debuted at number 60 on the U.S. Billboard Hot Country Songs chart for the week of June 4, 2011.

Background
Of the song, Nichols says, "It takes me back to when I was a kid, and we would go out to the lake or the river and chill out all day. We'd do some stuff that we weren't supposed to be doing."

Critical reception
Kyle Ward of Roughstock gave the song three and a half stars out of five, calling it "a pleasant up-tempo piece of summertime ear candy." In his review of the album, Ben Foster of Country Universe wrote that the song is "a fun enough tune, but it's too forgettable, not to mention interchangeable with any other summer song."

Music video
The music video, which premiered in August 2011, was directed by Potsy Ponciroli and filmed in downtown Nashville.

Charts

Weekly charts

Year-end charts

References

2011 singles
2011 songs
Joe Nichols songs
Show Dog-Universal Music singles
Songs written by Ashley Gorley
Songs written by Dallas Davidson
Songs written by Kelley Lovelace
Song recordings produced by Buddy Cannon
Song recordings produced by Mark Wright (record producer)